Von Heeringen is a surname. Notable people with the surname include:

August von Heeringen (1855–1927), German admiral, brother of Josias
Josias von Heeringen (1850–1926), German general